Kim Na-young (born December 8, 1981) is a South Korean television personality, comedian, and Paris street fashion model. She was a cast member in the variety show We Got Married.

Personal life
On April 27, 2015, Kim married her non-celebrity fiancé in a private ceremony on Jeju Island. However, her husband was arrested in November 2018 for allegedly violating the law on capital market and financial investment. He allegedly pocketed about 22.3 billion won ($19.69 million) from 1,063 victims while running an unauthorized futures investment company. In January 2019 few months after the arrest of her husband, Kim Na-young announced on her YouTube channel  that she would split from her  husband. She had two children from her arrested husband.

On December 16, 2021, it was reported that Kim had a relationship with painter Mai Q, with the two developing their relationship since November 2021.

Fashion career
Belgium's famous street style website, STYLE DU MONDE had been featuring Na-young's street fashion photos since 2013 in their website.

Philanthropy
On June 13, 2022, Kim donated 100 million won from Kim's YouTube income, to be given to a single female family through the Beautiful Foundation.

On December 11, 2022, Kim will donate proceeds from filming to her YouTube channel, to help single mothers.

Filmography

Television shows

References

External links
 

1981 births
Living people
South Korean television personalities